Walthamstow is the debut album by English boy band East 17. The album entered the UK Albums Chart at number 1 on 27 February 1993 and contains three UK Top 10 singles: their debut single "House of Love", released in 1992 (No. 10), third single "Deep" (No. 5), and sixth single "It's Alright" (No. 3).

The album was shortlisted for the 1993 Mercury Prize and was certified Platinum in the UK.

Track listing

Notes
 signifies an additional producer
 signifies a remixer

Charts

Weekly charts

Year-end charts

Certifications

References

1993 debut albums
East 17 albums
London Records albums
Albums produced by Richard Stannard (songwriter)